A Tremendously Rich Man (German: Ein steinreicher Mann) is a 1932 German comedy film directed by Steve Sekely and starring Curt Bois, Dolly Haas and Adele Sandrock. It premiered on 13 February 1932. The film was a co-production between the German subsidiary of Universal Pictures and the German firm Tobis Film. It was shot at the Johannisthal Studios in Berlin. The film's sets were designed by the art directors Carl Böhm and Erich Czerwonski.

Synopsis
After he accidentally swallows a very valuable diamond, a jeweler's assistant is pursued by a variety of people including criminals. With the assistance of his girlfriend Dolly he manages to evade them.

Cast
 Curt Bois as Curt 
 Dolly Haas as Dolly 
 Adele Sandrock as Adele 
 Liselotte Schaak as Ulla 
 Egon Brosig as Fürst 
 Fritz Ley as Notar 
 Paul Hörbiger as Linkerton 
 Willi Schur as Emil 
 Paul Biensfeldt as Ferdinand 
 Margarete Kupfer as Bella da Vasco 
 Friedrich Ettel as Arzt 
 Annie Ann   
 Eduard Rothauser   
 Josef Dahmen   
 Peter Ihle   
 Hermann Picha   
 Hermann Pittschau   
 Walter Steinbeck   
 Michael von Newlinsky

References

Bibliography
 Grange, William. Cultural Chronicle of the Weimar Republic. Scarecrow Press, 2008.
 Klaus, Ulrich J. Deutsche Tonfilme: Jahrgang 1932. Klaus-Archiv, 1988.

External links

1932 films
Films of the Weimar Republic
1932 comedy films
German comedy films
1930s German-language films
Films directed by Steve Sekely
Films produced by Joe Pasternak
German black-and-white films
Universal Pictures films
Tobis Film films
1930s German films
Films shot at Johannisthal Studios